Sirisak Musbu-ngor is a professional footballer from Thailand. He is currently playing as a  left-winger.

Honour
 Lamphun Warrior
 Thai League 3 (1): 2020-2021

Personal life
Sirisak has a brother, Sittichai Masbu-ngor, who is also a professional footballer.

References

External links
 
 https://www.livesoccer888.com/thaipremierleague/teams/Trat-FC/Players/Sirisak-Musbu-ngor
 https://www.smmsport.com/reader/news/253529
 http://player.7mth.com/1958215/index.shtml
 https://www.thsport.com/news-71313.html

1986 births
Living people
Sirisak Musbu-ngor
Association football forwards
Sirisak Musbu-ngor
Sirisak Musbu-ngor
Sirisak Musbu-ngor